Yoo Sung-je (born 16 July 1985 in Seoul) is a Korean ice hockey goaltender. He played for Anyang Halla from 2009 through 2012.

References

1985 births
Living people
Ice hockey people from Seoul
South Korean ice hockey goaltenders